Max Lehmann may refer to:

 Max Lehmann (historian) (1845–1929), German historian
 Max Lehmann (footballer) (1906–2009), French-Swiss footballer